A destructive and deadly tornado outbreak that took place across the Southern and Central United States from May 1 to May 3, 2008. The outbreak was responsible for at least seven fatalities (six from tornadoes) and 23 injuries in Arkansas. There were at least 29 tornado reports from Iowa to Oklahoma on May 1 and 67 more in Arkansas, Missouri, Mississippi, Tennessee, Louisiana and Texas on May 2. A total of 60 tornadoes were confirmed by weather authorities.

Meteorological synopsis

On May 1, 2008, a large low pressure system developed over Nebraska, with a long warm front stretching east towards the Great Lakes. A cold front and dry line were situated across Oklahoma and Kansas during the late afternoon. The Storm Prediction Center (SPC) issued a moderate risk of severe weather for eastern Kansas and a small part of Missouri, which included Kansas City.  On May 2 another moderate risk of severe weather was issued by the SPC from Central Illinois to northern Louisiana.  The risk area was later revised southward to only include eastern Arkansas, western Tennessee, and northwestern Mississippi.  Most of the severe weather shifted into Arkansas where dewpoints were near  with CAPE values over 2000 j/kg (in some places up to 3000 j/kg) and helicity values (potential for rotating winds) were exceeding 200 m2/s2.

While most of the severe activity was situated across the southern states, tornado watches were also issued for portions of southern Wisconsin, southern Michigan and northern Indiana as activity developed near the center of the low.  No tornadoes were reported in this watch area.

On the northern fringes of the storm system heavy snow fell across northeastern Wyoming and western South Dakota. Several other areas received one – four feet (30 – 120 cm) of snow.

Confirmed tornadoes

May 1 event

May 2 event

May 3 event

Impact

Kansas City area derecho/tornadoes
Thunderstorms developed during the late afternoon and early evening of May 1 near Oklahoma City and Kansas City, and produced large hail of up to  near Midwest City, Oklahoma. There was extensive hail damage throughout Oklahoma County.  Ten tornadoes also touched down from these storms in Kansas and Oklahoma.

 In the overnight hours of May 2, the supercells  re-organized into a squall line/serial derecho that moved across the eastern Great Plains.   Significant damage was reported across the Kansas City area, particularly in the Gladstone area near 77th Street and Euclid and northwest of Liberty near 108th Street and Cookingham were several homes and businesses were severely damaged or destroyed, including an Arby's restaurant. Several other commercial structures and homes sustained significant damage and railway cars were also overturned. Forty-thousand Kansas City Power & Light customers were left without power. At least three people were injured by the storms in the Kansas City Metro Area. St. Pius X High School and Oak Hill Day School were closed on Friday as a result of the storm.

It was later confirmed that much of the damage was caused by two strong tornadoes that were embedded inside the derecho; an EF2 in Gladstone and an EF3 in Brookridge.  According to Kansas City Mayor Mark Funkhouser, over 300 structures were damaged. In Gladstone over 200 buildings were damaged and several were destroyed according to the mayor. Tornadoes also hit Douglas County, Kansas causing locally significant damage. There no reports of fatalities with these storms. It was later reported that despite tornado warnings, many tornado sirens were not sounded in Douglas County and in other parts of the Kansas City Metro.

Five years prior to these tornadoes, areas near Gladstone were hit by an F4 tornado that caused extensive damage while a strong tornado also hit near Liberty during the same outbreak.

Arkansas tornadoes
At around 8:30 am CDT on May 2, an EF3 tornado touched down north of Little Rock in Conway County, killing two people. The tornado then proceeded into Van Buren County and caused extensive damage to the Damascus area and killed three people. One person was also killed in Benton County by straight-line winds when a tree fell onto the mobile home where she was sleeping. In Pulaski County, another person was killed by a tornado. Some damage was reported to several structures south and east of Little Rock including near Hensley were the fatality was reported.

At around 3:30 pm CDT, a large F3 tornado hit the town of Earle, Arkansas west of Memphis causing major damage to homes, businesses and the high school, and several people were injured. A supercell to its north also produced a significant tornado in the Etowah area causing extensive damage to several structures including destroyed trailers.

Governor of Arkansas Mike Beebe stated that in Arkansas alone about 350 homes were damaged or destroyed. Seven counties were declared disaster areas including Van Buren, Saline, Pulaski, Cleburne, Conway, Grant and Benton. National Guard were deployed to assist in the cleanup and relief efforts. About 6,000 homes lost power across much of north Arkansas.

See also
 List of North American tornadoes and tornado outbreaks
 Tornado outbreak sequence of May 7–15, 2008
 Tornado outbreak sequence of May 22–31, 2008

Notes

References

External links
 NWS Little Rock, Arkansas summary page
 NWS Memphis, Tennessee summary page
 NWS Kansas City, Kansas summary page
 NWS Springfield, MO summary page
 Multimedia Review from the Severe weather event from the NWS Tulsa
 Severe weather outbreak gallery from WMC-TV
 Severe weather outbreak gallery from KAIT-TV
 FEMA analysis

Tornadoes of 2008
F3 tornadoes
Tornadoes in Arkansas
Tornadoes in Iowa
Tornadoes in Kansas
Tornadoes in Louisiana
Tornadoes in Mississippi
Tornadoes in Missouri
Tornadoes in Oklahoma
Tornadoes in Tennessee
Tornadoes in Texas
2008 natural disasters in the United States
May 2008 events in North America